Colin Martindale (March 21, 1943 – November 16, 2008) was a professor of psychology at the University of Maine for 35 years.
 
Martindale studied creativity and artistic processes. His most popular work was The Clockwork Muse (1990), in which he argued that artistic development over time in written, visual, and musical works was the result of a search for novelty that could be quantified and studied to the point that art history could be treated as an experimental science.

Martindale was awarded the 1984 American Association for the Advancement of Science Prize for Behavioral Science Research.

Bibliography
Romantic Progression: The Psychology of Literary History, Hemisphere Pub., June 1, 1975, 
Cognition and consciousness (The Dorsey series in psychology, Dorsey Press, 1981,  
 The Clockwork Muse: The Predictability of Artistic Change, New York: Basic Books, 1990, 
 Evolutionary and neurocognitive approaches to aesthetics, creativity, and the arts, Amityville, NY: Baywood Pub., 2007,

References

External links 
Bangor Dailey News obituary

20th-century American psychologists
University of Maine faculty
University of Colorado alumni
Harvard University alumni
1943 births
2008 deaths
People from Fort Morgan, Colorado